Nikola & Fattiglapparna is Nikola Sarcević's third solo album. Released in early 2010, it is his first to be recorded entirely in the Swedish language, and his first on the Stalemate Music label.

The album contains a variety of genres but mostly focuses around folk-influenced rock and pop, in contrast to Sarcevic's work with punk rock band Millencolin.

Track listing 
Bocka Av
Mitt Örebro		
Tro
Sämre Lögnare
Tappa Tempo
På Väg
Kommunicera
Det mesta talar nog för att vi kommer skiljas
Hemstad	
Upp på Tybble Torg
Utan Dig

Lineup
Nikola Sarcevic: Vocals, Guitars and Harmonica
Henrik Wind: Electric and Acoustic guitars, Lapsteel, Bass, Banjo, Pianos, Organs, Cembalo, Vibraphone, Harmonica and Backing Vocals
Richard Harrysson: Drums and Percussion
Fredrik Landh: Backing Vocals
Clas Olofsson: Acoustic guitars and Lapsteel
Peter Nygren: Piano
Martin Landh: Accordion and Flugelhorn
Niklas Bäcklund: Flute

External links
Nikola Sarcevic Official Website - Discography

2010 albums